Dorcadion blanchardi is a species of beetle in the family Cerambycidae. It was described by Mulsant and Rey in 1863. It is known from Iran and Turkey.

References

blanchardi
Beetles described in 1863